Cape Henderson is an ice-free cape, overlain by morainic drift, marking the northwest end of the Bunger Hills in Antarctica.

References

Headlands of Queen Mary Land